Family Circle was an American magazine that covered such topics as homemaking, recipes, and health. It was published from 1932 until the end of 2019. Originally distributed at supermarkets, it was one of the "Seven Sisters," a group of seven traditional "women's service" magazines centered on household issues, along with Ladies' Home Journal, McCall's, Good Housekeeping, Better Homes and Gardens, Woman's Day, and Redbook.

History
Family Circle was first published in 1932. It was initially distributed for free at Piggly Wiggly supermarkets, until it was offered as a freestanding publication in 1946.

Cowles Magazines and Broadcasting bought the magazine in 1962. The New York Times Company bought the magazine for its woman's magazine division in 1971. The division was sold to Gruner + Jahr in 1994. When Gruner + Jahr decided to exit the US magazine market in 2005, the magazine was sold to the Meredith Corporation.

From 1973 to 2015, Family Circle was the title sponsor of the Family Circle Cup (Charleston Open) women's professional tennis tournament on the WTA Tour, which was held at its namesake Family Circle Tennis Center in Charleston, South Carolina starting in 2001. At the time the sponsorship ended, Family Circle was the longest-running title sponsor in professional tennis. In 1992 the magazine also ran the first lady cookie competition for the spouses of incumbent or running presidential candidates; the results successfully predicted the presidential winner in 5 of the seven election cycles since its founding.

In November 2009, Family Circle launched their social network Momster.com for moms of tweens and teens.

In October 2019, Meredith Corporation announced Family Circle would cease publication with the December 2019 issue. At the time, the publisher reported the magazine had 13 million readers, more than 1 million followers on social media, and a circulation of 4 million. As part of the closure, about 25 Family Circle staffers would be laid off, while others would take jobs at other Meredith publications.

Editors
Harry Evans (1932–1936)
Robert Endicott (1936–1954)
Robert Jones (1955–1965)
Arthur Hettich (1965–1985)
Gay Bryant (1985–1986)
Arthur Hettich (1986–1988)
Jacqueline Leo (1988–1994)
Susan Kelliher Ungaro (1994–2006)
Linda Fears (2006–2017)
Cheryl Brown (2017–2019)

References

Further reading
 Article by Erwin V. Johanningmeier in the St. James Encyclopedia of Pop Culture http://findarticles.com/p/articles/mi_g1epc/is_tov/ai_2419100416

External links
The rise and fall of Family Circle at SITE123
Family Circle Books & Magazine Archives from the 1970s - 1980s at eCRATER
Family Circle Archives at Webstarts

1932 establishments in New York (state)
2019 disestablishments in New York (state)
Defunct Meredith Corporation magazines
Defunct women's magazines published in the United States
Magazines established in 1932
Magazines disestablished in 2019
Magazines published in New York City
Monthly magazines published in the United States